The Balmhorn (3,698 m) is a mountain in the Bernese Alps in Switzerland. Its summit ridge lies on the border between the cantons of Berne and the Valais.

It was first climbed by Frank Walker, Horace Walker and Lucy Walker, with guides Jakob Anderegg and  Melchior Anderegg on 21 July 1864.

Huts
Balmhornhütte
Lötschenpasshütte
Berghotel Schwarenbach

See also
List of mountains of Switzerland
List of mountains of the canton of Bern
List of mountains of Valais
List of most isolated mountains of Switzerland

References

Mountains of the Alps
Alpine three-thousanders
Mountains of Switzerland
Bernese Alps
Mountains of Valais
Mountains of the canton of Bern
Bern–Valais border